Mount Golub is a prominent  mountain summit located in the Chilkat Range of the Saint Elias Mountains, in the U.S. state of Alaska. Although modest in elevation, relief is significant since Mount Golub rises above tidewater in less than two miles. The mountain's name was officially adopted in 1972 by the U.S. Board on Geographic Names to commemorate Harvey Golub (1930–1971), member of the 1968 first ascent party. Other members of the party were Richard Folta, Delbert Carnes, and Keith Hart. Hart submitted the name for consideration following the September 4, 1971, untimely death of Harvey Golub who perished in the Alaska Airlines Flight 1866 disaster. That flight, which took all 111 lives aboard, crashed in a canyon approximately seven miles south of his namesake mountain.

Climate

Based on the Köppen climate classification, Mount Golub has a subarctic climate with cold, snowy winters, and cool summers. Weather systems coming off the Gulf of Alaska are forced upwards by the Saint Elias Mountains (orographic lift), causing heavy precipitation in the form of rainfall and snowfall. Temperatures can drop below −20 °C with wind chill factors below −30 °C. The month of July offers the most favorable weather for viewing or climbing Mount Golub.

See also

List of mountain peaks of Alaska
Geography of Alaska

References

Gallery

External links
 Mount Golub: weather forecast
 Flickr photo: Mt. Golub and whale

Golub
Golub
Golub
Golub